House at No. 48 Grove Street is a historic home located at Mount Morris in Livingston County, New York. It is believed to have been built in 1854, with late-19th century modifications.  It is distinguished by an overlay of fanciful early- and late-Victorian era ornamentation, with Gothic Revival details.  It features a two-story rounded bay projecting from the northwest corner of main block.

It was listed on the National Register of Historic Places in 1999.

References

Houses on the National Register of Historic Places in New York (state)
Houses completed in 1854
Houses in Livingston County, New York
National Register of Historic Places in Livingston County, New York